James Michael Rashad Holman (born January 17, 1978) is a former professional American football cornerback in the National Football League. He played three seasons for the San Francisco 49ers. He was drafted in the sixth round out of the University of Louisville.

References 

1978 births
Living people
Players of American football from Louisville, Kentucky
American football cornerbacks
Louisville Cardinals football players
San Francisco 49ers players